Miss Belgium 2014 was the 46th edition of the Miss Belgium held on January 11, 2014 at the Plopsaland Theater in  De Panne, Belgium.

The winner, Laurence Langen from Limburg, was crowned by the outgoing title holder, Noémie Happart (Miss Belgium 2013). Langen would represent Belgium in the competitions of Miss Universe 2014 and Miss World 2014, but gave up due to health problems, which prevented her participation. The first runner-up of the contest, Anissa Blondin took her place.

Winner and runners-up

Special awards

Official Contestants
24 candidates competed for the title:

References

External links

Miss Belgium
2014 beauty pageants
2014 in Belgium